Gary William Lane (born November 1964) is a professional chess player and author. He became an International Master in 1987 and won the Commonwealth Chess Championship in 1988.  He has written over thirty books on chess, including Find the Winning Move, Improve Your Chess in 7 Days and Prepare to Attack. There have been translations in French, Italian, Portuguese and Spanish. In the 1980s the ITV documentary "To Kill a King" was screened nationwide in Great Britain. It featured a young Michael Adams and Lane. This feature is shown regularly at chess film festivals.

Chess career 
After his marriage to Woman International Master Nancy Jones, he moved to Australia, winning the Australian Chess Championship in 2004. He won the 2005 Oceania Chess Championship and represented Oceania at the Chess World Cup 2005.

He has also represented Australia in the 2002, 2004, and 2006 Chess Olympiads. In the 2004 Olympiad he helped Australia score a 2–2 draw with his former country England, scoring a decisive win over World Championship title contender Nigel Short. 
He has been a chess coach for England or Australia at the World Junior and also European Junior championship for over a decade.

In 2012 he won the George Trundle Masters in Auckland, New Zealand with a score of 7/9, and the NZ South Island Championships in Dunedin, with a score of 8/9. He was unbeaten in both events.

In 2015 at the Australian tournament the Doeberl Cup he beat Loek van Wely the reigning Dutch Champion and one of the world's leading players. 
 He played the Closed Sicilian which he has also written about in two books.
In 2016 he came =1st at George Trundle Masters in Auckland, New Zealand with a score of 7/9, and followed this up with =1st place scoring 8/9 at the NZ South Island Championships in Canterbury. He did not lose any games in the two events.
At the 2nd Fiji International Open Chess Tournament Lane dominated the event winning with the perfect score of 7/7.
A score of 9/9 and clear first place was the result at the 1st Fiji International Rapid Open.

In 2020 the chess world largely closed own due to Covid restrictions. However, before the lockdown Lane was =1st at the Newcastle Open in Australia 
He also won outright the Exeter Open in the UK with a score of 4.5/5 which was the last weekend tournament played in England for the whole of 2020.

In 2021 a chess themed café in Sydney called Queenside introduced the GARY LANE (big breakfast roll)  It is a warm bun with bacon, egg, confit mushrooms, hash brown, vintage cheddar, HP sauce and potato crisps. There is no mention of the amount of calories involved.

Auckland, New Zealand was the venue for the Asian Seniors chess tournament in 2022. Lane won the over 50 section with a score of 8/9 and remained unbeaten. The title came with an automatic bonus Grandmaster norm. 

Lane became the New South Wales Blitz champion at the end of 2022. His score of 9/11 saw him see off his younger rivals including his son Ryan in a clash of the Lanes.  

Lane is a supporter of Torquay United F.C.

Books

References

External links

 Chess Questions answered by Gary Lane

1964 births
Living people
Australian chess players
Australian chess writers
Chess International Masters